F-Stops is an album by American jazz trombonist and composer Craig Harris recorded in 1993 and released on the Italian Soul Note label.

Reception
The Allmusic review by Scott Yanow awarded the album 4½ stars stating "Harris takes some of his finest recorded solos ever throughout this project, making it obvious that he is a major trombonist".

Track listing
All compositions by Craig Harris
 "Say Essay" – 14:32 
 "F-Stops: 1st Flow" – 5:40 
 "F-Stops: 2nd Flow" – 3:12 
 "F-Stops: 3rd Flow" – 7:08 
 "F-Stops: 4th Flow" – 4:14 
 "F-Stops: 5th Flow" – 6:02 
 "F-Stops: 6th Flow" – 1:06 
 "F-Stops: 7th Flow" – 2:56 
 "D.A.S.H." – 5:46 
 "Generations" – 5:32 
 "High Life" – 9:28 
 "A Soft Shoe" – 3:32 
 "Burundi" – 8:17 
Recorded at Sear Sound in New York City on June 24 & 25, 1993

Personnel
Craig Harris – trombone, didgeridoo, vocals
John Stubblefield – tenor saxophone 
Hamiet Bluiett – baritone saxophone
Darrell Grant – piano, keyboards
Bill White – guitar
Calvin X Jones – double bass 
Tony Lewis – drums

References 

Black Saint/Soul Note albums
Craig Harris albums
1993 albums